The 1971 Xavier Musketeers football team was an American football team that represented Xavier University as an independent during the 1971 NCAA University Division football season. In their second year under head coach Dick Selcer, the team compiled a 1–9 record.

Schedule

References

Xavier
Xavier Musketeers football seasons
Xavier Musketeers football